Glyndon Township is a township in Clay County, Minnesota, United States. The population was 281 at the 2000 census.

Glyndon Township took its name from Glyndon, Minnesota.

Geography

Demographics
As of the census of 2000, there were 281 people, 97 households, and 87 families residing in the township.  The population density was 8.3 people per square mile (3.2/km2).  There were 114 housing units at an average density of 3.4/sq mi (1.3/km2).  The racial makeup of the township was 95.37% White, 1.42% Native American, 1.07% Asian, and 2.14% from two or more races. Hispanic or Latino of any race were 1.78% of the population.

There were 97 households, out of which 38.1% had children under the age of 18 living with them, 82.5% were married couples living together, 4.1% had a female householder with no husband present, and 9.3% were non-families. 9.3% of all households were made up of individuals, and 2.1% had someone living alone who was 65 years of age or older.  The average household size was 2.90 and the average family size was 3.06.

In the township the population was spread out, with 29.5% under the age of 18, 5.3% from 18 to 24, 28.8% from 25 to 44, 25.6% from 45 to 64, and 10.7% who were 65 years of age or older.  The median age was 39 years. For every 100 females, there were 111.3 males.  For every 100 females age 18 and over, there were 106.3 males.

The median income for a household in the township was $46,250, and the median income for a family was $53,750. Males had a median income of $36,500 versus $21,250 for females. The per capita income for the township was $21,309.  About 2.3% of families and 3.3% of the population were below the poverty line, including none of those under the age of eighteen or sixty five or over.

References

Townships in Clay County, Minnesota
Townships in Minnesota